The 2014–15 Xavier Musketeers men's basketball team represented Xavier University during the 2014–15 NCAA Division I men's basketball season. Led by fifth year head coach Chris Mack, they played their games at the Cintas Center and were second year members of the Big East Conference. They finished the season 23–14, 9–9 in Big East play to finish in sixth place. They advanced to the championship game of the Big East tournament where they lost to Villanova. They received an at-large bid to the NCAA tournament where they defeated Ole Miss in the second round and Georgia State in the Third Round before losing in the Sweet Sixteen to Arizona.

Previous season
The Musketeers finished the 2014–15 season 21–13, 10–8 in Big East play to finish in a three-way tie for third place. They advanced to the semifinals of the Big East tournament where they lost to Creighton. They received an at-large bid to the NCAA tournament where the lost in the first round ("First Four") to NC State.

Departures

Incoming recruits

Rankings

Rankings

Source

Roster

Schedule

|-
!colspan=9 style="background:#062252; color:#FFFFFF;"| Exhibition

|-
!colspan=9 style="background:#062252; color:#FFFFFF;"| Regular season

|-
!colspan=9 style="background:#062252; color:#FFFFFF;"| Big East tournament

|-
!colspan=9 style="background:#062252; color:#FFFFFF;"| NCAA tournament

Notes

References

Xavier Musketeers men's basketball seasons
Xavier
Xavier